Lee Yong-woo (born April 15, 1981) is a South Korean actor and dancer. He graduated from the Korea National University of Arts with a degree in Dance and joined the modern dance company Laboratory Dance Project in 2001. Lee made his acting debut in 2009 and has since starred in television dramas such as Style and Birdie Buddy. He is also one of the coaches/judges (called "masters") in the reality competition show Dancing 9.

Filmography

Television series

Film

Variety show

Music video

Stage

Awards and nominations

References

External links
Lee Yong-woo Fan Cafe at Daum 

1981 births
Living people
South Korean male dancers
21st-century South Korean male actors
South Korean male television actors
South Korean male film actors
South Korean male musical theatre actors
Korea National University of Arts alumni